For Yugoslavia was a political alliance that existed in the Republic of Montenegro from the late 1990s to 2001. It was led by Momir Bulatović's SNP and based on pro-Miloševićism. It emphasized the necessity to maintain the Federal Republic of Yugoslavia, the state union of Serbia and Montenegro.

It was composed by:
 Socialist People's Party of Montenegro (SNP)
 Yugoslav Left (JUL)
 Serb People's Party (SNS)
 Serb Radical Party (SRS)

With the purge within SNP when its entire pro-Momirist leadership left and founded the People's Socialist Party, SNP broke away from its pro-Milošević partners and formed the Together for Yugoslavia Alliance which managed to maintain a stalwart opposition.

Bulatović's supporters founded a pro-Milošević bloc known as the Patriotic Coalition for Yugoslavia that succeeded the For Yugoslavia alliance.

References

Defunct political party alliances in Montenegro
Serb political parties in Montenegro
Politics of Serbia and Montenegro